Jacona is an unincorporated community and census-designated place in Santa Fe County, New Mexico, United States. Its population was 412 as of the 2010 census.

The name is a Spanish approximation of Sakona, the Tewa name of the pueblo which was abandoned in 1696.

Geography

Demographics

Education
It is zoned to Pojoaque Valley Schools. Pojoaque Valley High School is the zoned comprehensive high school.

References

Census-designated places in New Mexico
Census-designated places in Santa Fe County, New Mexico